Philadelphia Yearly Meeting of the Religious Society of Friends, or simply Philadelphia Yearly Meeting, or PYM, is the central organizing body for Quaker meetings in the Philadelphia, Pennsylvania, United States, area, including parts of Pennsylvania, Maryland, Delaware and New Jersey.

PYM is one of the oldest Yearly Meetings in the Religious Society of Friends. In 1827, it divided into two Meetings in the Hicksite/Orthodox schism, each Meeting claiming the title of Philadelphia Yearly Meeting. In this period the two Meetings were known by the location of their respective meetinghouses (Race Street and Arch Street). In 1955, the schism was healed and the two Meetings reunited. The Yearly Meeting is a member of Friends General Conference, the main national organization of unprogrammed Quaker Meetings. The Yearly Meeting is also a member of the National Council of Churches.

Westtown School, founded before the schism, and Haverford College and Bryn Mawr College became the educational mainstays of the Orthodox yearly meeting. George School and Swarthmore College were founded to provide education for the Hicksite students. While the schools remain under the indirect supervision of the reunited Yearly Meeting, both are functionally and financially independent of the Yearly Meeting, as are other Friends Schools in the area; they may be governed by members of the Society of Friends, but they are structurally independent of the Monthly and Yearly Meetings. The colleges have no formal relationship with the Meeting.

Philadelphia Yearly Meeting holds annual sessions for business to which all Friends in the Philadelphia area are asked to come.  These meetings, generally held in March at the Arch Street Friends Meeting House, are an opportunity for Friends to hear about the goings-on in PYM over the previous year and other Yearly Meetings that have sent news. PYM is overseen by a General Secretary.   Christie Duncan-Tessmer is the current general secretary and has been since the retirement of the previous general secretary, Arthur M. Larrabee, on August 25, 2014. She was previously the  Associate Secretary for Program and Religious Life for PYM, a position she took in 2008.

References

External links

Young Friends: The high school age youth group of Philadelphia Yearly Meeting

Churches in Philadelphia
Quaker yearly meetings
Members of the National Council of Churches
Quakerism in Pennsylvania
Annual events in Pennsylvania